The Beaman Oak was the largest white oak tree in the Commonwealth of Massachusetts. It stood in the front yard of a colonial era three-story house in the town of Lancaster. It was so named because Gamaliel Beaman had originally settled the spot in 1659. The oak became known as a prominent landmark in Central Massachusetts and is featured prominently on the town seal of West Boylston.

The oak's trunk was partially hollow towards the end of its life. After a storm severely damaged it, the tree was cut down in 1989.

See also
 List of individual trees

References 

Individual oak trees
1980s individual tree deaths
Individual trees in Massachusetts